The women's solo synchronized swimming event at the 2010 Commonwealth Games was held on 6 and 7 October, at the SPM Swimming Pool Complex.
Eight soloists competed. There were two rounds of competition, with the preliminary round consisting of a technical routine and a free routine.

Results

References

Aquatics at the 2010 Commonwealth Games
Synchronised swimming at the 2010 Commonwealth Games
Commonwealth Games
2010 in women's sport